Polyozellus  is a fungal genus in the family Thelephoraceae, a grouping of mushrooms known collectively as the leathery earthfans. Previously considered a monotypic genus, it now contains the Polyozellus multiplex species complex. The genus name is derived from the Greek poly meaning many, and oz, meaning branch. It is commonly known as the blue chanterelle, the clustered blue chanterelle, or, in Alaska, the black chanterelle. The distinctive fruit body of this species comprises blue- to purple-colored clusters of vase- or spoon-shaped caps with veiny wrinkles on the undersurface that run down the length of the stem.

Polyozellus has had a varied taxonomic history and has been reclassified several times at both the family and genus level.  The range of Polyozellus includes North America and eastern Asia, where it grows on the ground of coniferous forests, usually under spruce and fir trees. It contains edible species, and has been harvested for commercial purposes.

History and taxonomy

The first published description of the species was written by botanist Lucien M. Underwood in 1899, based on a specimen found the previous year in the woods of Mount Desert, Maine. Although he called the new species a Cantharellus, he noted that "the plant is a remarkable one and from its habit might well form a distinct genus since it has little in common with Cantharellus except its fold-like gills." In 1910, William Murrill transferred it to the new genus Polyozellus; Murrill thought the compound structure of the stem to be a sufficiently unique characteristic to warrant it being separated from Cantharellus species, which have simpler stem structures. In 1920, specimens from a Japanese collection compiled by A. Yasuda were sent to mycologist Curtis Gates Lloyd, who believed the fungus to be a new species and named it Phyllocarbon yasudai.

No further collections of the fungus were reported until 1937, when it was found in Quebec, Canada. The next year, Paul Shope considered the genus Polyozellus to be superfluous, pointed out that the compound fruit bodies and the wrinkled hymenium were instead consistent with the genus Craterellus. In 1939, American mycologist Lee Oras Overholts, in a letter to the journal Mycologia, opined that both of these authors had overlooked a 1925 publication by Calvin Henry Kauffman, who made notes and photos of the species collected in the Rocky Mountains of Wyoming and Colorado, and in the Cascade Mountains of Washington and Oregon. Kauffman believed the species to be merely "a very extreme growth condition" of Cantharellus clavatus (now known as Gomphus clavatus) and suggested there was no reason for transferring the species to the genus Craterellus. Mycologists Alexander H. Smith and Elizabeth Eaton Morse, in their 1947 publication on Cantharellus species in the United States, placed the species in a new section Polyozellus, but did not separate it from the genus Cantharellus; they defined the distinguishing characteristics of Polyozellus as the small, roughened, hyaline spores and the color change of the flesh in potassium hydroxide solution, adding that "the spores are unusual for the genus but in our estimation do not warrant excluding the species."

In 1953, Rokuya Imazeki took into consideration differences in spore characteristics: species in the genus Cantharellus were not known to have spores that were subglobose (roughly spherical) and tuberculate (covered with wart-like projections) like Polyozellus; however, these spore characteristics were common in species in the family Thelephoraceae (Cantharellus belongs in a different family, the Cantharellaceae). Other characteristics linking the blue chanterelle with the Thelephoraceae included the dark color, the strong odor (especially in dried specimens), and the presence of thelephoric acid, a mushroom pigment common in the family. Taken together, these factors led Imazeki to propose the new family Phylacteriaceae. The suggested family-level taxonomical change was not accepted by other authors; for example, in 1954, Seiichi Kawamura renamed it Thelephora multiplex. 

In 2017, researchers from eastern Europe and North America collaborated on a molecular phylogeny of the previously monotypic Polyozellus multiplex. They determined that Polyozellus contains five species that are distinguished by spore size and geographic region: the small-spored P. multiplex and P. atrolazulinus and the large-spored P. mariae, P. marymargaretae, and P. purpureoniger. As of 2022, both Index Fungorum and MycoBank list Polyozellus as being within the family Thelephoraceae, a grouping of mushrooms commonly known as the leathery earthfans.  

Common names for this genus include the blue chanterelle and the clustered blue chanterelle. In Alaska, where specimens typically have very dark-colored fruit bodies, it is called the black chanterelle, although this name is shared with some Craterellus species.

Habitat and distribution

Polyozellus grows in coniferous woods under spruce and fir, and more frequently at higher elevations. It is most often encountered in summer and fall.

This genus is northern and alpine in distribution, and rarely encountered. Collections have been made in the United States (including Maine, Oregon, Colorado, New Mexico, and Alaska), Canada (Quebec and British Columbia), China, Japan, and Korea. The disjunct distribution of this species in North America and East Asia has been noted to occur in a number of other fungal species as well. Polyozellus is also found in the Queen Charlotte Islands, where it is commercially harvested.

References

Cited literature

External links

 California Fungi Photo and further information

Thelephorales
Thelephorales genera
Edible fungi
Fungi of Asia
Fungi of North America
Medicinal fungi
Monotypic Basidiomycota genera
Taxa named by William Alphonso Murrill